"The Advisors Alliance" is a 2017 Chinese two-part television series based on the life of Sima Yi, a government official and military general who lived in the late Eastern Han dynasty and Three Kingdoms period of China. The series starred Wu Xiubo as the main character, with Liu Tao, Li Chen, Janine Chang, Tang Yixin, Yu Hewei and Wang Luoyong playing supporting roles. The first part of the series started airing on Jiangsu TV and Anhui TV on 22 June 2017. The second part started airing on Youku on 8 December 2017.

Synopsis
The series follows the life of Sima Yi through the late Eastern Han dynasty and Three Kingdoms period of China.

The first part covers Sima Yi's early career under Cao Cao, the warlord who controls the central government and the figurehead Emperor Xian towards the end of the Eastern Han dynasty. Sima Yi becomes an adviser to Cao Cao's son Cao Pi and assists him in defeating his younger brother Cao Zhi in a power struggle over the succession to their father's place. Following Cao Cao's death, Cao Pi usurps the throne from Emperor Xian, ends the Eastern Han dynasty, and declares himself emperor of the newly established Cao Wei state. This part ends around the middle or towards the end of Cao Pi's reign.

The second part covers Sima Yi's career in the Cao Wei state during the Three Kingdoms period and his service under the emperors Cao Pi, Cao Rui and Cao Fang. He leads Cao Wei forces into battles against its rival states, Shu Han and Eastern Wu, and rises through the ranks to become one of the most powerful figures in Cao Wei and ultimately a regent for the third Cao Wei emperor, Cao Fang. In his final years, Sima Yi successfully stages a coup d'état against his co-regent Cao Shuang and effectively becomes the de facto ruler of the Cao Wei state. About 15 years after Sima Yi's death, his grandson Sima Yan would eventually usurp the Cao Wei throne and replace it with the Jin dynasty (266–420).

Cast

Part 1

 Wu Xiubo as Sima Yi
 Liu Tao as Zhang Chunhua
 Li Chen as Cao Pi
 Yu Hewei as Cao Cao
 Tang Yixin as Guo Zhao (based on Guo Nüwang)
 Janine Chang as Bai Lingyun (based on Lady Bai)
 Zhai Tianlin as Yang Xiu
 Zhang Zhixi as Zhen Fu
 Wang Dong as Sima Fu
 Xiao Shunyao as Sima Shi
 Lin Jingzhe as Sima Shi (child)
 Rong Zishan as Sima Shi (young)
 Tan Jianci as Sima Zhao
 Mei Zihan as Sima Zhao (young)
 Zhang He as Cao Zhen
 Wang Jinsong as Xun Yu
 Lai Xi as Hou Ji
 Chu Quanzhong as Chen Qun
 Cao Lei as Guo Jia
 Lu Siyu as Ji Bu
 Wang Renjun as Cao Zhi
 Liu Lingzhi as Deng Ai
 Liu Yue as Zhong Hui
 Xu Huanshan as Hua Tuo
 Huang Junpeng as Xu Shu
 Ding Haifeng as Sun Quan
 Zhang Zhizhong as Sima Fang
 Li Youwei as Sima Lang
 Zhang Doudou as Xiahou Hui
 Xu Min as Zhong Yao
 Lu Xingyu as Lu Xun
 Chen Zhihui as Cao Hong
 Luan Junwei as Ding Yi
 Lu Ling as Lady Bian
 Yang Meng as Xun You
 Liu Jian as Yang Biao
 Wang Li as Man Chong
 Yin Guohua as Shi Chun
 Wang Xiuqiang as Jia Kui
 Wang Zeqing as Cui Yan
 Lu Yanqi as Xiaoyuan
 Liu Yulin as Cheng Yu
 Du Xingqi as Cao Xiu
 Zhang Xingzhe as Xiahou Shang
 Yang Hanbin as Xiahou Dun
 Cheng Cheng as Xiahou Xuan
 Li Shengye as Xiahou Mao
 Li Long as Xu Chu
 Guo Mingyu as Cao Zhang
 Li Yuyang as Princess Qinghe
 Hou Tongjiang as Uncle Fang
 Wang Zengqi as Wu Zhi
 Ren Yu as Liu Zhen
 Wang Maolei as Liu Xie (Emperor Xian)
 Tan Shasha as Consort Dong
 Yu Shuxin as Elder Princess
 Wu Yuyu as Younger Princess
 Wang Bozhao as Liu Bei
 Guo Jianuo as Zhang He
 Zhao Xin as Ziye
 Wang Hucheng as Zhang Zhao
 Zhao Yanmin as Dong Cheng
 Li Zhenze as Xiaozhou
 Tianbao as Cao Chong
 Li Xiaolong as Tian Liu
 Dalai Halihu as Cao Biao
 Liu Guhao as Cui Shen
 Chang Jin as Cao Ren
 Zhang Jun as Zhang Yin
 Lü Xinshun as Zhan Qian
 Li Haiying as Zhou Tai
 Shen Xuewei as Guan Jun
 Zhang Yongmin as Fa Jian
 Wei Yu as Xu Huang
 Liu Xu as Zhang Liao
 Cui Huaijie as Li Zheng
 Yao Xinyan as Sima Lang's daughter
 Huang Yi as Cao Rui (young)
 Zhao Yunzhuo as Princess Dongxiang

Part 2

 Wu Xiubo as Sima Yi
 Wang Luoyong as Zhuge Liang
 Liu Huan as Cao Rui
 Li Chen as Cao Pi
 Liu Tao as Zhang Chunhua
 Janine Chang as Bai Lingyun
 Tang Yixin as Guo Zhao (based on Guo Nüwang)
 Xiao Shunyao as Sima Shi
 Tan Jianci as Sima Zhao
 Du Yiheng as Cao Shuang
 Wang Dong as Sima Fu
 Lu Siyu as Ji Bu
 Xiao Rongsheng as Zhao Yun
 Pu Tao as Wang Yuanji 
 Zhang He as Cao Zhen
 Lai Xi as Hou Ji
 Chu Quanzhong as Chen Qun
 Liu Lingzhi as Deng Ai
 Liu Yue as Zhong Hui
 Zhang Doudou as Xiahou Hui
 Yin Guohua as Shi Chun
 Du Xingqi as Cao Xiu
 Lu Yanqi as Xiaoyuan
 Zhang Xingzhe as Xiahou Shang
 Cheng Cheng as Xiahou Xuan
 Li Shengye as Xiahou Mao
 Guo Jianuo as Zhang He
 Chen Zhelun as Cao Fang
 Sheng Zihang as Cao Fang (young)
 Han Dong as Wei Yan
 Yan Wenxuan as He Yan
 Zhao Huanyu as Ding Mi
 Yan Jie as Sun Li
 He Xiang as Guo Huai
 Guo Ye as Wang Shuang
 Cao Jiqiang as Meng Da 
 Lu Yong as Sun Zi 
 Liu Guoji as Liu Fang 
 Wang Zi as Zhang Hu
 Zhu Yonglin as Han Lin
 Jiang Han as Liu Shan
 Bai Haitao as Jiang Wei
 Song Tao as Gao Xiang
 Xiao Bing as Huang Hao
 Liu Guangnan as Ma Su
 Xu Zhanwei as Ma Dai
 Hao Rongguang as Wang Ping
 Kang Fei as Guan Xing
 Gong Fangmin as Jiang Wan
 Wang Tieling as Wu Ban
 Chen Lixin as Yang Yi
 Li Yuhao as Deng Xian
 Hui Junping as Zhu Ran
 Zhang Yong as Zhou Fang
 Zhang Tianyang as Bixie
 Hu Li as Yue Lin
 Zheng Xintong as Lady Liu
 Chen Zhihui as Cao Hong
 Shi Guang as Cao Yu
 Fu Zhengyang as Cao Zhao
 Liu Qi as Sima Lun
 He Meiqi as Sima Rou
 Kuang Can as Chen Dao
 Wang Bozhao as Liu Bei
 Wang Li as Man Chong
 Xu Min as Zhong Yao
 Lu Xingyu as Lu Xun
 Wang Xiuqiang as Jia Kui
 Xu Yuanyuan as Qingxiao
 Wen Jing as Empress Dowager Guo
 Deng Yange as Jianjia
 Wang Zengqi as Wu Zhi

Production
The series took five years and cost a total of 400 million yuan in production, with most of the money going into the sets. More than 6,000 costumes were made for the series. Wu Xiubo, the lead actor, serves as the executive producer of the series.
Filming lasted for 333 days, beginning on 13 February 2016 and ending on 10 January 2017.

Soundtrack

Reception

Critical response
The series received high praise for its plot, cinematography and cast performance. The first part of the series generated six billion hits on Youku and 8.2 points out of 10 on Douban. A mobile game adapted from the series was also released. However, some viewers have criticised the series on the grounds of historical inaccuracies, and said that the additional details and modern lines in the series serve as distractions and ruin the mood.

Ratings 

 Highest ratings are marked in red, lowest ratings are marked in blue

Awards and nominations

References

External links

2017 Chinese television series debuts
2017 Chinese television series endings
Chinese historical television series
Mandarin-language television shows
Television series set in the Three Kingdoms
Jiangsu Television original programming
Anhui Television original programming